Daboy en Da Girl is a Philippine television situational comedy series broadcast by GMA Network. Starring Rosanna Roces and Rudy Fernandez, it premiered in 2002. The series concluded in 2003.

The series is streaming online on YouTube.

Cast and characters
Lead cast
 Rudy Fernandez as Daboy
 Rosanna Roces as Girly

Supporting cast
 Jeffrey Quizon as Emoks
 Alma Moreno as Brenda
 Sunshine Dizon as Baby
 Rochelle Pangilinan as Britney
 Isko "Brod Pete" Salvador as Chief Lobatt
 Lolit Solis as Manay Charing
 Rico J. Puno as Boy Brocha
 Robert Ortega as Moses
 Elizabeth Ramsey
 K Brosas
 Gene Padilla
 Pepita Smith
 Bembol Roco
 Eissen Bayubay

References

External links
 

2002 Philippine television series debuts
2003 Philippine television series endings
Filipino-language television shows
GMA Network original programming
Philippine comedy television series